Lokroi can refer to:

 the Locrians, an ancient Greek tribe
 Locris, a region of ancient Greece and a former province of Greece
 Locri, a town in Italy founded by Locrian colonists
 Lokroi (municipality), a municipality in Greece founded in 2011